The Operational Land Imager (OLI) is a remote sensing instrument aboard Landsat 8, built by Ball Aerospace & Technologies. Landsat 8 is the successor to Landsat 7 and was launched on February 11, 2013.

OLI is a push broom scanner that uses a four-mirror telescope with fixed mirrors.

Overview and mission 
OLI operates alongside TIRS (Thermal Infrared Sensor) on board the LDCM. The build and design of OLI differs from previous generations of instruments, while still maintaining data continuity with archived Landsat data from the last 40 years by keeping the same spectral and spatial resolutions of previous instruments.

OLI aids the Landsat-8 mission in the imaging of Earth's surface and the collection of moderate resolution data that is used to monitor changing trends on the surface and evaluate how land usage changes over time. The images and data that OLI has helped collect have practical applications today in agriculture, mapping, and monitoring changes in snow, ice, and water.

Specifications and design 
OLI is a pushbroom sensor that operates in the visible (VIS) and short wave infrared (SWIR) spectral regions. The OLI has nine spectral bands, including a panchromatic band: 

While the spectral and spatial resolution of OLI's channels were kept the same as prior instruments in order to maintain data continuity with the entire Landsat archive, two spectral bands (the first a blue visible channel and the second an infrared channel) were added. These bands were designated as band 1 and band 9, and serve as an enhancement from previous instruments, which lacked these channels. Band 1 was created to locate and determine water resources and investigate coastal areas, and band 9 serves a unique purpose of detecting cirrus clouds.

Applications 
OLI has several different applications due to the many different bands. Band 1 is helpful in imaging shallow water resources and tracking aerosols. Bands 2, 3, and 4 are in the visible spectrum and are helpful in creating true color composite images. Band 5 is helpful for ecology purposes and can help determine vegetation index or NDVI. Bands 6 and 7 are useful in geology and can help in distinguishing different saturated and unsaturated rocks and soils. Band 8 is helpful in creating images with very high resolution and precision. Band 9 is used for detecting different types of clouds.

References

Further reading

External links 
 Operational Land Imager at Ball.com
 Operational Land Imager at NASA.gov

Satellite imaging sensors